497th may refer to:

497th Air Refueling Wing, inactive United States Air Force unit
497th Bombardment Group, inactive United States Air Force unit
497th Bombardment Squadron, inactive United States Air Force unit
497th Combat Training Squadron, United States Air Force unit
497th Intelligence, Surveillance and Reconnaissance Group (497 ISRG) is an intelligence unit at Joint Base Langley–Eustis, Virginia

See also
497 (number)
497, the year 497 (CDXCVII) of the Julian calendar
497 BC